Ottley Laborde is a striker from Montserrat who plays in the Montserrat Championship. He is a Montserrat international and currently plays for Ideal SC

Career
Ottley played for both ideal SC and the Montserrat Royal Police Force in the Montserrat Championship. During his time he managed to win the golden boot twice. His record goals in a season is 21 which he scored for the police force. He is now vice president of the Montserrat Football Association

Laborde played for two different clubs in the Montserrat Championship. He started off his career with the Montserrat police force he played for them up until 2002 when he transferred to Ideal SC where in 2004 he won the championship for a 5th time.

Honours
Montserrat Championship-
golden boot

International career
He represented Montserrat three times but did not score any goals.

Montserratian footballers
Montserrat international footballers
1967 births
Living people
Association football forwards